Protein MCM10 homolog is a protein that in humans is encoded by the MCM10 gene. It is essential for activation of the Cdc45:Mcm2-7:GINS helicase, and thus required for proper DNA replication.

Function 

The protein encoded by this gene is one of the highly conserved mini-chromosome maintenance proteins (MCM) that are involved in the initiation of eukaryotic genome replication. The protein complex formed by MCM proteins is a key component of the pre-replication complex (pre-RC) and it may be involved in the formation of replication forks and in the recruitment of other DNA replication related proteins. This protein can interact with MCM2 and MCM6, as well as with the origin recognition protein ORC2. It is regulated by proteolysis and phosphorylation in a cell cycle-dependent manner. Studies of a similar protein in Xenopus suggest that the chromatin binding of this protein at the onset of DNA replication is after pre-RC assembly and before origin unwinding. Alternatively spliced transcript variants encoding distinct isoforms have been identified.

Interactions 

MCM10 has been shown to interact with ORC2L.

References

Further reading